Petra Hinz (born 10 June 1962 in Essen) is a German politician and impostor. She is a member of the SPD. Since 2005, Hinz has been an MP of the German Bundestag. She resigned from her Bundestag seat after a CV scandal with effect of 1 September 2016.

Biography
Hinz left school with a university of applied sciences entrance qualification in 1983, and afterwards completed a year of internship at a local bank (Sparkasse) and a vocational training as a presenter from 1985 to 1987. From 1999 to 2003 she worked as a real estate manager. Hinz has been a SPD member since 1980 and worked for the party since 1982 in different positions, such as vice district chairwoman. From 1989 to 2005 she was a member of the Essen city council.

CV scandal
Hinz made headlines after allegations that she bullied her employees and faked essential parts of her curriculum vitae (CV), falsely claiming that she took her A-levels in 1984 and studied Law and Political Science for ten years from 1985 to 1995. Hinz admitted that she faked her CV. She resigned from her Bundestag mandate only after growing public pressure on 24 August 2016, but because of a formal error her request was considered as preliminary invalid by the Bundestag administration. On 30 August, it was reported that the resignation of her Bundestag seat with effect of 1 September 2016 was now formally accepted. Hinz also announced that she will resign from the SPD party until 5 September 2016, after the party had initiated internal proceedings against her. The case of Petra Hinz was viewed as a "disaster" for the SPD party.

References

External links
 Petra Hinz at the German Bundestag

1962 births
Living people
Members of the Bundestag for North Rhine-Westphalia
Politicians from Essen
Members of the Bundestag 2013–2017
Members of the Bundestag 2009–2013
Members of the Bundestag 2005–2009
Members of the Bundestag for the Social Democratic Party of Germany
Impostors